The Crestwood Ladies Fall Classic was an annual bonspiel, or curling tournament, that took place at the Crestwood Curling Club in Edmonton, Alberta. It was established in 2014 and ran until 2018, when it was discontinued. The event was held in a round robin format.

Through its five editions, the event featured mainly Albertan teams, however, only two of the winning teams were from there. The tournament also included teams from other Canadian provinces such as British Columbia, Manitoba, New Brunswick, Saskatchewan, and the Northwest Territories. International teams from China, Japan, Russia, South Korea, Switzerland, and the United States all competed in the event as well, with Gim Un-chi of South Korea and Victoria Moiseeva of Russia winning in 2014 and 2017 respectively.

Past champions

References

External links
Home Page

Former World Curling Tour events
Women's World Curling Tour events
Sport in Edmonton
Curling in Alberta